"Channel Z" is a song by American band the B-52's from their fifth studio album, Cosmic Thing (1989). The song was the first single from Cosmic Thing but did not achieve as much success as the follow-ups "Love Shack" and "Roam". In 1990, the single was reissued with a new 12-inch mix after these two singles. Multiple renditions of the song were released, including the album version and a 7-inch single edit and remix, as well as a "rock mix" and a "rock dub" which were on a five-track CD single in the United States.

Meaning
Fred Schneider told an interviewer in 2008 that the song was "probably our most straightforward political song up until then... It was about the state of the country [at the time]. And who knew nearly 20 years later it'd be worse?"

Critical reception
Music critic Stephen Thomas Erlewine described it as "a fine song that effortlessly updated the classic B-52's sound", adding that "it made for a good single and still stands as one of their better songs of the era."

Chart performance
In the United States, "Channel Z" topped the Billboard Modern Rock Tracks chart in August 1989. In Belgium, it reached the top 50, peaking at number 43 on the Ultratop chart. The song peaked at number 61 on the UK Singles Chart following the 12-inch release in 1990.

Music video
The song's music video features the B-52's playing on stage in front of an audience, along with clips of them running through a forest. It was shot outside of New York City according to the credits of The B-52's 1979–1989.

Charts

Release history

See also
 List of Billboard number-one alternative singles of the 1980s

References

1989 songs
1989 singles
The B-52's songs
Reprise Records singles
Song recordings produced by Don Was
Songs written by Cindy Wilson
Songs written by Fred Schneider
Songs written by Kate Pierson
Songs written by Keith Strickland